Juliet of the Spirits is a 1965 fantasy comedy-drama film directed by Federico Fellini and starring Giulietta Masina, Sandra Milo, Mario Pisu, Valentina Cortese, and Valeska Gert. The film is about the visions, memories, and mysticism that help a middle-aged woman find the strength to leave her philandering husband. The film uses "caricatural types and dream situations to represent a psychic landscape." It was Fellini's first feature-length color film, but followed his use of color in "The Temptation of Doctor Antonio" episode in the portmanteau film Boccaccio '70 (1962).

The film was shown in competition at the 26th Venice International Film Festival, and received Academy Award nominations for Best Costume Design and Best Set Decoration. It won the 1966 Golden Globe Award for Best Foreign Language Film, and Giulietta Masina won a David di Donatello for her performance. Woody Allen loosely remade it with his 1990 film Alice.

Plot

Giulietta Boldrini, an upper-class housewife, attempts to deal with her mundane life and philandering, oppressive husband, Giorgio, by exploring the odd lifestyle of a glamorous neighbour, Suzy, and through dreams, visions and fantasies. As she taps into her desires (and her demons) she slowly gains greater self-awareness, leading to independence, although, according to Masina (Fellini's wife), the ending's meaning is debatable.

Cast

Production
Juliet of the Spirits was shot on location in Fregene, and at Safa-Palatino and Cinecittà Studios in Rome.

Fellini's longtime musical collaborator Nino Rota composed the soundtrack. Until his death in 1979, Rota wrote the music for every Fellini film except his directorial debut, Variety Lights. The music in Juliet of the Spirits contains circus themes, as in Fellini's 8½, and also uses organ, cocktail piano, guitar, saxophones, and voices without words to convey Juliet's shifts in feeling. The soundtrack was mentioned in a profile of actor Steve Buscemi, which notes that "a Victrola sits in [Buscemi's] dining room, with the theme music for 'Juliet of the Spirits' permanently on its turntable."

Reception
On Rotten Tomatoes, the film has an approval rating of 79% based on 28 reviews, with an average rating of 7.3/10. On Metacritic, which assigns a normalized rating to reviews, the film's rerelease has a weighted average score of 83 out of 100, based on 9 critics, indicating "universal acclaim".

In The New York Times, Stephen Holden wrote of a revival in 2001: "Fellini went deliriously and brilliantly bananas with the color to create a rollicking through-the-looking-glass series of tableaus evoking a woman's troubled psyche." Roger Ebert gave the film four stars out of four and included it in his 2001 list of "The Great Movies". Kevin Thomas of the Los Angeles Times praised the film, writing, "Federico Fellini's 1965 Juliet of the Spirits remains a timeless, major work of a master, a portrait of a dutiful wife plunged into crisis that triggers her spiritual awakening. With Fellini's own wife, the great Giulietta Masina, as Juliet, and with his unique command of fantasy and spectacle in full force, Juliet of the Spirits, Fellini's first film in color, is at once an eye-popping display of bravura and a work of compassionate insight."

The film was less well received in Italy. Giovanni Grazzini of Corriere della Sera wrote, "It is known that Fellini's imagination, in recent years, has been unrestrained by a taste conventionally called baroque: ornamental delirium, decorative bliss. Juliet's marital crisis is thus suffocated by the scenographic luxury, the clamor or the tenderness of the colors, the bizarre splendor of the costumes; although sometimes there is an authentic heartbeat of humanity."

Awards and nominations

References

Bibliography

External links
 
 
 
 
 Juliet of the Spirits – Review: Roger Ebert (2001; Great Movie)
 Juliet of the Spirits – Review: Bosley Crowther (1965; NYT)
 Juliet of the Spirits – an essay by John Baxter at The Criterion Collection

1965 films
1960s fantasy comedy-drama films
1960s Italian-language films
Films directed by Federico Fellini
Films scored by Nino Rota
Films set in Rome
Films shot at Palatino Studios
French fantasy comedy-drama films
Italian fantasy comedy-drama films
1960s Italian films
1960s French films